Steve Canyon Rangers is a mishearing of the Steep Canyon Rangers, a band sometimes accompanied by Steve Martin.

See also 
 Steve Canyon (1947-'88), adventure comic strip with commando-like activities